Islam-aga's Mosque is the  only working mosque in Niš, Serbia. There is another in Niš Fortress which is converted into a gallery, and another close to the University Rectorate, that was damaged during the Anglo-American bombing of the city in 1944.

It was built in 1720 and reconstructed in 1870. Of the twenty mosques in Niš during Ottoman rule, it is the only one that remains in use. It was torched during riots on 17 March 2004, and reconstructed in its original shape in August 2013.

See also
Islam in Serbia
Islamic architecture
List of mosques

Mosques in Serbia
Buildings and structures in Niš
Ottoman architecture in Serbia
18th-century establishments in Serbia
Rebuilt buildings and structures in Serbia